Garcorops is a genus of east African wall spiders that was first described by J. A. Corronca in 2003.  it contains three species, found on Madagascar and Comoros: G. jocquei, G. madagascar, and G. paulyi. In addition, one species, †Garcorops jadis Bosselaers, 2004 , is only known from a fossil found in copal on Madagascar:

See also
 List of Selenopidae species

References

Araneomorphae genera
Selenopidae
Spiders of Africa